John David Jarrett (born November 18, 1970 in Denver, Colorado) is an American former Nordic combined skier who competed in the 1990s, including the 1994 Winter Olympics and the 1998 Winter Olympics.

Jarrett finished seventh in the 3 x 10 km team event at the 1994 Winter Olympics in Lillehammer. He also finished 4th in the Team Event at the World Championships in 1995 in Thunder Bay, Canada.  He was also 5th in Trondheim, Norway World Championships in the team event.  He had many consistent top 15 and top 20 World Cup results as well.  He was the first one in his peer group to actually score World Cup points in 1994 in Steamboat, Colorado with a 13th place.  It is important to note at that time WC points were only awarded to the top 15 finishers in each race.

Since retiring in 1998, he began his coaching career while finishing his degree at the University of Colorado in Boulder.  He has a degree in Kinesiology and Applied Physiology.  He coached some XC skiers while at CU and when he graduated he moved to Heber City, Utah to start a ski club at Soldier Hollow which was the venue for the 2002 Winter Olympics in Salt Lake City.  After the 2002 Olympics he took a job with the US Ski Team's Nordic Combined program.  Eventually he rose to the headcoaching  position in 2008.  His team won a Silver Medal in 2007 World Championships in Sapporo, Janpan.  Billy Demong taking the Silver in the Individual Gundersen.  In 2009, his team won 3 Golds and 1 Bronze at the World Championships in Liberec, CZE.  Those medals split between Todd Lodwick with 2 Golds and Billy Demong with Gold and Bronze.  In the 2010 his team won 4 out of the 7 medals possible in Nordic Combined skiing at the Olympic Winter Games.  Johnny Spillane won 3 Silver Medals, Billy Demong won 1 Gold and 1 Silver and the Nordic Combined Team won the Silver Medal in the Team Event with Billy Demong, Johnny Spillane, Todd Lodwick, and Brett Camertota.

References

 
 Nordic combined team Olympic results: 1988-2002 

1970 births
Living people
American male Nordic combined skiers
Olympic Nordic combined skiers of the United States
Nordic combined skiers at the 1994 Winter Olympics
Nordic combined skiers at the 1998 Winter Olympics
Skiers from Denver